The Cloud Cap Inn is a historic building located high on Mount Hood, Oregon, United States. It was a luxury inn for mountain climbers that included telephones as early as 1894.

The inn opened in 1889 and closed as a business in 1946.

Since the 1950s, the Crag Rats search and rescue group has used and maintained the inn.

The building was listed on the National Register of Historic Places in 1974.

See also

 National Register of Historic Places listings in Hood River County, Oregon
 Silcox Hut
 Timberline Lodge

References

External links

Cloud Cap Inn - documentary produced by Oregon Public Broadcasting

1889 establishments in Oregon
Hotel buildings completed in 1889
Defunct hotels in Oregon
Buildings and structures in Hood River County, Oregon
National Register of Historic Places in Hood River County, Oregon
Shingle Style architecture in Oregon
Historic district contributing properties in Oregon
Hotels established in 1889
Hotels disestablished in 1946
1946 disestablishments in Oregon